The 1992 United States presidential election in Nevada took place on November 3, 1992, as part of the 1992 United States presidential election. Voters chose four representatives, or electors to the Electoral College, who voted for president and vice president.

Nevada was won by Governor Bill Clinton (D-Arkansas) with 37.36% of the popular vote over incumbent President George H. W. Bush (R-Texas) with 34.73%. Businessman Ross Perot (I-Texas) finished in third, with 26.19% of the popular vote. Clinton ultimately won the national vote, defeating incumbent President Bush and Perot.

Clinton's win, although narrow, would mark the beginning of Nevada's transition from a safe Republican state into a swing state; in all three presidential elections held in the 1980s, Republicans had dominated Nevada by double digit margins and swept every county. Although Clinton carried only two of the state's seventeen counties, his win in Clark County, where Las Vegas is located, and the most populous county in the state, would prove the key to this and future Democratic victories in Nevada.

Clinton's percentage of the vote was the lowest to win a state since Woodrow Wilson carried only 32.08 percent of the vote in Idaho in 1912. 

, this is the last time a Democratic presidential candidate carried White Pine County in a presidential election, and the last one where a third-party candidate carried any Nevada county. In this case, Ross Perot carried Storey County. Clinton became the first ever Democrat to win the White House without carrying Esmeralda or Mineral Counties, as well as the first to do so without carrying Nye County since Harry S. Truman in 1948, and the first to do so without carrying Storey County since John F. Kennedy in 1960.

Results

Results by county

See also
United States presidential elections in Nevada

Notes

References

Nevada
1992
1992 Nevada elections